Matan Peleg (born 11 November 1993) is a Guatemalan professional footballer who plays as a right back for Liga Leumit club Hapoel Petah Tikva and the Guatemala national team. Adopted and raised in Israel, he also holds Israeli citizenship.

Early life
Peleg was born in Guatemala but moved to Israel at an early age, when he was adopted by Israeli parents at two years old, and raised in kibbutz Shaʽar HaGolan.

International career
On 4 June 2021, Peleg made his debut for the Guatemala national football team in their match against Saint Vincent and the Grenadines during the 2022 FIFA World Cup qualification. He played 90 minutes and had two assists in Guatemala's 10–0 victory.

Honors
Hapoel Nof HaGalil
Toto Cup Leumit (1): 2019–20

References

External links
 

1993 births
Living people
Guatemalan footballers
Association football fullbacks
Guatemala international footballers
Adoptees
Converts to Judaism
Guatemalan Jews
Jewish footballers
Guatemalan emigrants to Israel
Naturalized citizens of Israel
Footballers from Northern District (Israel)
Israeli footballers
Ironi Tiberias F.C. players
Hapoel Bnei Lod F.C. players
Hapoel Rishon LeZion F.C. players
Beitar Jerusalem F.C. players
Hapoel Marmorek F.C. players
Hapoel Nof HaGalil F.C. players
Hapoel Kfar Saba F.C. players
Liga Leumit players
Israeli Premier League players
Israeli people of Guatemalan descent
Sportspeople of Guatemalan descent
Jewish Israeli sportspeople